Confessions of a Teenage Baboon is a young adult novel by Paul Zindel, published in 1977. The semi-autobiographical book tells of Chris, the son of a nurse who works with terminally ill patients, and his coming to terms with his selfhood and his mother.

Plot
Chris Boyd, at fifteen, is an only child.  The story is told from Chris' point of view as the son of Helen, his mother who works as a live-in practical nurse.  His father left the family (by saying he was going out to buy a newspaper) when Chris was a young child, moving to Mexico and then dying there a short time later.

Helen and Chris move into the Dipardi residence for Helen's most recent assignment, to care for Carmelita Dipardi, the mother of Lloyd Dipardi.  Lloyd is described by Chris to be "about thirty years old with enough muscles to beat up anyone within a ten mile radius".  There's also "Pops", Lloyd's father, who appears to suffer from dementia.  Lloyd has hired Helen to care for his mother.

Chris has held on to a relic of the past, a chesterfield trench coat that once belonged to his father, and which he hopes to someday grow into.  Helen has her own issues, such as making Chris urinate in a milk bottle on assignments where they don't have their own private bathroom.  Helen also takes household items and other goods from clients for her own use, often without asking, and this soon manifests in one of many confrontations between the hard-drinking and partying Lloyd and the more introverted Chris.

Chris also befriends Harold, a boy about his own age with a physique similar to Lloyd's.  Harold serves as a buffer between the rather tense relationship between Chris and Lloyd.  Harold understands Chris' insecurities as a peer, but also defends Lloyd, as Lloyd has helped him develop his own body and become the picture of health he later became, as well as his confidence.

Over the course of the assignment, Chris and Lloyd begin to learn from each other, and Lloyd helps Chris develop a workout regimen, and even helps him become confident enough to smash the milk bottle and stand up to his mother.  The assignment ends with the death of Carmelita, and Chris and Helen move on.  Then while on a bus, Chris learns that Helen has intentionally left behind his father's trench coat.  Chris immediately runs off the bus and back to the Dipardi house to retrieve it, believing that Lloyd has shredded it for Helen literally cleaning them out.

What Chris finds is nothing at all what he expected.  He sympathizes with Lloyd's sadness over the loss of his mother.  Likewise, Lloyd sympathizes with Chris, aware of his difficult home life.  Nonetheless, both share a common bond...a difficult relationship with their mothers, that no matter what challenges exist, they will always cherish.

It is a turning point in Chris' life.  He returns to his mother, but leaves the coat behind, no longer feeling the need to have it.

Reception
The novel was referenced as a suggesting reading for "less able adult readers" in 1982. Critic of youth literature Lilian Shapiro was not a fan, and Kenneth Donelson in 1981 thought it was a "bit of fluff". A decade later, Donelson remarked that "Zindel had turned into a jokester". In 1982, Don Nilsen and Alleen Pace Nilsen praise Zindel's humor, including the "natural sounding grossness" in Chris introduction of himself.

References

External links
Paul Zindel official website

1977 American novels
American young adult novels
Novels by Paul Zindel
Novels set in Staten Island